Stanley Davis “Dave” Phillips (born 1942, High Point, North Carolina-Nov 20, 2022) was the chairman and chief executive officer of Phillips Industries, Inc. and was a political appointee as U.S. Ambassador to Estonia from April 16, 2007 until January 16, 2009.

Biography
Phillips attended Choate Rosemary Hall and the University of North Carolina at Chapel Hill, where he joined the Beta chapter of Delta Kappa Epsilon.  Choate awarded him the 2010 Choate Seal Prize.

Business career
Phillips was the founding chairman of Phillips Factors Corp., a financial services firm which merged with BB&T Corp., founder of Phillips Mills (merged with Culp Inc.) and a founding partner of the Market Square Partnership, which merged with Vornado Realty Trust.

References

External links
Dave Phillips: ‘Extraordinary Catalyst’ New book puts industry veteran, Market Square and High Point in spotlight

1942 births
Living people
American chief executives
Ambassadors of the United States to Estonia